Clearasil is a brand of skin care and acne medication, whose products contain chiefly benzoyl peroxide, sulfur and resorcinol, triclosan, or salicylic acid as active ingredients. Clearasil has a wide range of products both for rapid and sometimes slow acne treatment and for everyday prevention. The products are marketed to customers worldwide.

History
Clearasil was invented in the United States in 1950 by Ivan Combe with the help of chemist Kedzie Teller. At this time, it was the first dermatological brand created specially for younger skin to fight against pimples (acne). The active ingredients in the original product were sulfur and resorcinol, similar to the pre-existing adult acne product Acnomel. Combe used the popular ABC television show American Bandstand to help promote the product and its superior smell.

In 1960 the brand was bought by Richardson-Vicks. In 1975, Wolfman Jack signed a contract promoting the product Clearasil Acne Ointment. In 1985 Richardson-Vicks was acquired by Procter & Gamble together with Clearasil. In 2000 Clearasil moved to the Boots Group portfolio. In 2006 Boots Healthcare International was purchased by the United Kingdom's Reckitt.

Controversy
A 2018 ad titled  Pimples Make Terrible Prom Dates was called homophobic by critics, who accused it of promoting anti-gay stereotypes. The ad features 2 teenage girls preparing for Prom, when one discovers a pimple.  The pimple, which is shown as an effeminate man with a shrieking voice in a pink ruffled suit who punctuates his words with a flamboyant kick before flipping his hair back and settling into a pointed toe pose. But an application of Clearasil kills it, and their prom dates are saved.

References

External links
Official Clearasil Website
Canadian Clearasil Website
U.S. Clearasil Website
UK Clearasil Website
Japanese Clearasil Website

Skin care brands
Reckitt brands
Acne treatments
Products introduced in 1950